John Ramsey may refer to:
John R. Ramsey (1862–1933), U.S. Representative for New Jersey (1917–1921)
John Ramsey (pseudonym), pseudonym of British dramatist Reginald Owen (1887–1972)
John Ramsey (announcer) (1927–1990), Los Angeles-area sports announcer
John Bennett Ramsey (born 1943), father of JonBenét Ramsey
John Michael Ramsey (fl. 1974–2013), American analytical chemist
John A. Ramsey (born 1990), founder of the Liberty for All PAC

See also
John Ramsay (disambiguation)
JonBenét Ramsey (1990–1996), American child beauty pageant contestant who was murdered in her home in Boulder, Colorado, in 1996